The GE ES59ACi, also known as the HXN5 or China Mainline Locomotive, is a type of diesel locomotive built by GE Transportation Systems and Qishuyan Locomotive and Rolling Stock Works for use on freight trains from Harbin to Qiqihar and Mudanjiang in the People's Republic of China.

In October 2005, China Railway ordered 700 ES59ACi Evolution Series locomotives from GE Transportation Systems and Qishuyan Locomotive and Rolling Stock Works for delivery in 2008–2009. Two have been built at Erie, Pennsylvania, in 2008; the rest were assembled by Qishuyan at Changzhou in 2008–2010. The first Chinese made loco was unveiled on 25 November 2008.  The initial order was reduced from 700 to an actual 300 units produced.

Gallery

See also
 C38Emi - variant of GE Dash 9-44CW operating in Brazil
 GE C36-7 - operated by CR as ND5 locomotives
 China Railways NJ2
 China Railways HXN5B

References

HXN5
Co-Co locomotives
Railway locomotives introduced in 2008
Qishuyan locomotives
Standard gauge locomotives of China